MinnesotaCare is a health coverage program in the U.S. state of Minnesota for low-income individuals and families who do not have access to employee-sponsored health insurance and do not qualify for Medical Assistance (MA). It is administered by the Minnesota Department of Human Services.  Enrollees pay a monthly fee based on income and family size, among other factors. According to the Minnesota House of Representatives, as of June 2018, 88,305 individuals were enrolled in the MinnesotaCare program.

MinnesotaCare coverage, premiums and funding 
MinnesotaCare coverage includes "doctor visits, hospitalization, prescriptions, eye exams, eye glasses, dental care" and other services. Services are provided through prepaid health plans, who negotiate reimbursement rates with health care providers.

Public funding covers 94% of the actuarial value cost for a MinnesotaCare plan. Enrollees cover six percent of the plan's cost in the form of cost sharing for services and a monthly premium based on a sliding income scale. As of October 2018, MinnesotaCare monthly premiums range from $0 for those with incomes up to 34% of Federal Poverty Guidelines (FPG) to $12 per month for those with incomes at 100% FPG to $80 per month for those at 200% FPG.

In fiscal year 2017, the MinnesotaCare program paid $397.2 million for health care services provided to enrollees. State funds covered less than three percent of the cost.

MinnesotaCare was originally funded through a mix of enrollee premiums, federal funding and a 1.5% tax on healthcare services levied by the state. Following a reorganization of the program as a Basic Health Plan under the Affordable Care Act in 2013, the program is almost entirely funded by the federal government and enrollee premiums. The MinnesotaCare tax was raised to 1.8% in 2020. This tax typically has the effect of raising the cost of prescription drugs and medical services since it is passed on the covered individual.

As of 2018, 87% of the cost was paid for by the federal government, 9% by enrollee premiums and cost sharing, less than 3% percent by the state, and the remainder by the Federal Share Under Waiver.

Managed care organizations
According to Minnesota Department of Human Services, in year 2018, following health plans were available for MinnesotaCare applicants:
 HealthPartners
Hennepin Health
Itasca Medical Care
PrimeWest Health
South Country Health Alliance
UCare

Proposed expansions

Raising income limit 
In 2016, then-state Senator Tony Lourey (DFL–Kerrick) and State Representative Jennifer Schultz (DFL–Duluth) proposed increasing the income limit for MinnesotaCare eligibility from 200% FPG to 275% FPG. This change would have raised the annual income limit for a family of four from $48,600 to $66,825 under 2016 guidelines.

During the 2017 State of the State, DFL Governor Mark Dayton proposed expanding the eligibility limit for MinnesotaCare to 400% FPG. This change would have allowed families of four earning up to $98,400 under 2017 guidelines to purchase MinnesotaCare coverage for an undetermined premium.

"Buy in" proposal 
In 2016, the DFL-controlled Minnesota Senate passed legislation to begin the process of allowing Minnesotans with incomes exceeding the limit for traditional MinnesotaCare to "buy in" to MinnesotaCare coverage.

The 2016 legislation authorized the state to seek federal waivers necessary to allow the program to operate. Operational costs for the program and per member per month premium prices were not disclosed at that time. The proposal did not become law.

With the support of DFL Governor Mark Dayton, DFL legislators introduced a similar proposal in 2017.

In 2018, the Dayton administration estimated the average statewide cost of MinnesotaCare buy-in to be $659 per person per month, or $7,908 per year, for a silver level health plan. Silver level plans generally qualify as high deductible health plans, with individual deductibles exceeding $3,000 and family deductibles exceeding $11,000.

In comparison, for 2018, the Kaiser Family Foundation estimated the average cost of a privately sold silver level health plan to be $326 per person per month, or $3,912 per year, with similar deductibles.

To start the buy in program, Governor Dayton proposed spending roughly $100,000,000 in public funding for a financial reserve to back up the government-run insurance option. In addition, his administration estimated $13,000,000 in annual operating costs.

Governor Dayton has argued the buy-in plans would be eligible for federal premium tax credits (PTC) for those under 400% FPG, but this would require federal approval from the Trump Administration. Healthcare experts suggest a buy-in plan would not meet the definition of a "health plan" under federal regulations and therefore would not qualify for PTC.

Dayton's term as governor expired in January 2019, but his successor, DFL Governor Tim Walz, continues to support a buy-in option for MinnesotaCare and supported it in his 2018 gubernatorial campaign.

Critics have expressed three primary concerns about the viability of a MinnesotaCare buy-in. They argue low healthcare provider reimbursement rates set by the government for MinnesotaCare will result in few providers accepting patients with public option coverage. Were providers mandated to accept public option coverage, they argue rural hospitals and clinics would be driven to bankruptcy.

Critics have also questioned the feasibility of modifying the state-run MNsure marketplace to sell the buy-in plan due to MNsure's technological deficiencies.

In addition, critics question the affordability of a buy-in based on the Dayton administration's premium estimate, which is more than double current premiums for comparable value plans in the private market.

References

External links
 Minnesota Department of Human Services MinnesotaCare page
 MHCP Provider Manual
 Minnesota Statutes, Laws, and Rules

Government of Minnesota
Health insurance in the United States